Leitariegos (variant: Puerto de Leitariegos) is one of 54 parish councils in Cangas del Narcea, a municipality within the province and autonomous community of Asturias, in northern Spain.

Villages
 Brañas d'Abaxu
 Brañas d'Arriba
 La Venta la Farruquita
 La Pachalina
 El Puertu
 Trescastru

References

Parishes in Cangas del Narcea